Rodleben station is a railway station in the Rodleben district of the municipality of Dessau-Roßlau, Saxony-Anhalt, Germany.

References

Railway stations in Saxony-Anhalt
Buildings and structures in Dessau-Roßlau